"Smoke" is a song by American hip hop recording artist 50 Cent, released on March 31, 2014, as the fourth single from his fifth studio album Animal Ambition (2014). The song features singer Trey Songz and is produced by Dr. Dre and Dawaun Parker. This is the only song of Animal Ambition that is produced by 50 Cent's longtime mentor Dr. Dre.

Track listing 
Digital single
"Smoke"

Chart performance

Release history

References

2014 songs
2014 singles
50 Cent songs
Trey Songz songs
Song recordings produced by Dr. Dre
Song recordings produced by Mark Batson
Songs written by 50 Cent
Songs written by Chef Tone
Songs written by Trey Songz
G-Unit Records singles
Caroline Records singles
Songs written by Dawaun Parker